The Rolling Stones in Mono is a box set by the English rock band the Rolling Stones, released by ABKCO Records in September 2016. It contains most of the group's British and American studio albums from the 1960s in mono format, on fifteen compact discs or sixteen vinyl records. All tracks were remastered using the Direct Stream Digital process by Bob Ludwig. The original recordings were produced by Andrew Loog Oldham, Jimmy Miller and the Rolling Stones.

Content
The Rolling Stones in Mono omits the American versions of the band's debut album and of Between the Buttons; the former as there is only a difference of one track between the two, and the latter as it replaces two tracks with the 1967 single "Let's Spend the Night Together" backed with "Ruby Tuesday", both of which also appear on the compilation Flowers   included here. Their Satanic Majesties Request, Beggars Banquet and Let It Bleed were issued with identical track listings in each nation. The last two are not dedicated mono mixes, as none were made, but are the stereo mixes folded-down into mono. Albums included in this box set are listed below. The box also includes all tracks released on the band's two studio EPs, The Rolling Stones and Five by Five.

A compilation unique to this set, Stray Cats, comprises 24 tracks issued by the Stones in the 1960s that did not appear on the albums listed. Most were issued on singles. Two appeared on a 1964 Decca Records compilation of items from roster artists, Saturday Club; three tracks were on the band's first EP; although issued on the US live album Got Live If You Want It!, their version of "I've Been Loving You Too Long" is a studio recording with audience sounds added later. There is also the Italian language version of "As Tears Go By" issued in Italy and the dedicated mono mix of "Street Fighting Man" released as a single in the United States. Stray Cats also contains both covers of "Poison Ivy": one appearing on a Decca promotional album; the second on the band's first EP.

Albums
The Rolling Stones (UK, 1964)
12 X 5 (US, 1964)
The Rolling Stones No. 2 (UK, 1965)
The Rolling Stones, Now! (US, 1965)
Out of Our Heads (US, 1965)
Out of Our Heads (UK, 1965)
December's Children (And Everybody's) (US, 1965)
Aftermath (UK, 1966)
Aftermath (US, 1966)
Between the Buttons (UK, 1967)
Flowers (US, 1967)
Their Satanic Majesties Request (1967)
Beggars Banquet (1968)
Let It Bleed (1969)
Stray Cats (2016)

Stray Cats track listing
Catalogue numbers from Decca Records and London Records; chart positions from UK Singles Chart, Billboard Hot 100, and Billboard 200.

Personnel
Listing for Stray Cats compilation only; see individual albums for full personnel credits.
Mick Jagger – vocals, harmonica, percussion, glockenspiel, acoustic guitar
Keith Richards – acoustic and electric guitar, slide guitar, bass, fuzz bass, double bass, piano, vocals
Brian Jones – acoustic and electric guitar, slide guitar, harmonica, organ, Mellotron, dulcimer, marimba, vibraphone, glockenspiel, koto, accordion, flute, recorder, kazoo, jew's harp, saxophone, tuba, trombone, trumpet, harp, autoharp, sitar, tambura, percussion, sound effects, backing vocals
Bill Wyman – bass, fuzz bass, double bass, piano, organ, Mellotron, percussion, vocals
Charlie Watts – drums, percussion, backing vocals

Additional personnel
Ian Stewart – piano on "Stoned", "I've Been Loving You Too Long", "The Under Assistant West Coast Promotion Man", "Who's Driving Your Plane?", "Jumpin' Jack Flash", and "Honky Tonk Women"; organ on "I've Been Loving You Too Long" and "Long, Long While"
Mick Taylor – guitar on "Honky Tonk Women"
Jack Nitzsche – piano on "Sad Day", "Long, Long While", and "Who's Driving Your Plane?"
Nicky Hopkins – piano on "We Love You" and "Child of the Moon"; harpsichord on "Dandelion"; organ on "Child of the Moon"
John Lennon, Paul McCartney – backing vocals on "We Love You"
Jimmy Miller – backing vocals on "Jumpin' Jack Flash" and "Child of the Moon"; cowbell on "Honky Tonk Women"; drums on "You Can't Always Get What You Want"
Dave Mason – shehnai, bass drum on "Street Fighting Man"
Steve Gregory and Bud Beadle – saxophones on "Honky Tonk Women"
Reparata and the Delrons – background vocals on "Honky Tonk Women"
Nanette Newman, Doris Troy – background vocals on "Honky Tonk Women" and "You Can't Always Get What You Want"
Al Kooper – piano, organ, french horn on "You Can't Always Get What You Want"
Rocky Dijon – percussion on "Child of the Moon"; congas, maracas, tambourine on "You Can't Always Get What You Want"
London Bach Choir – on "You Can't Always Get What You Want"

Charts

References

The Rolling Stones compilation albums
2016 compilation albums
ABKCO Records compilation albums